Heidenreich is a German surname which may be translated as "Land of the Heathen," or "Power of the Heathens," or "Realm of the Heathens". Notable people with the surname include:
The original germanic meaning was: a person of power and wealth, see also: http://wiki-de.genealogy.net/Heidenreich_(Familienname) 
 Heidenreich of Chełmno, first bishop of the Bishopric of Chełmno, 1245–1263
 Adolf Heidenreich (1897–1958), German politician (SPD)
 Carl Heidenreich, German painter
 David Elias Heidenreich (1638–1688), German writer
 Elke Heidenreich (born 1943), German TV journalist and presenter, novelist, librettist, literary critic
 Fritz Heidenreich (1895–1966), German sculptor
 Gert Heidenreich (born 1944), German writer
 Gustav Heidenreich (1819–1855), German painter
 Hans-Jürgen Heidenreich (born 1967), German footballer
 Herbert Heidenreich (born 1954), German footballer
 Jakub Heidenreich, Czech footballer
 Jon Heidenreich (born 1972), American professional wrestler
 Kaspar Heidenreich (1510–1586), German reformer
 Ludwig Heidenreich von Callenberg (died 1637), German officer
 Maximilian Heidenreich (born 1967), German footballer
 Walter Heidenreich (born 1949), German preacher

Heydenreich is a variation of the name. Notable people include:

 Gustav Heinrich Heydenreich († 1897), German entomologist
 Karl Heinrich Heydenreich (1764–1801), German philosopher
 Ludwig Heinrich Heydenreich (1903–1978), German art historian
 Michał Heydenreich (1831–1886), Polish general

See also
 Heidenreichstein in Austria 
 Heidenreich Holding, a Norwegian company

German-language surnames